Apirat Heemkhao (born February 25, 1993), simply known as "Don",(), is a professional footballer from Rayong, Thailand.

He had two favorite footballer & idols. Cristiano Ronaldo - Portuguese world-class professional footballer and Ekaphan Inthasen - Thai professional footballer and Ex-national football team member.  They also played in same position as Apirat, winger.

In 2010, He is off the skill from high school level and being a genius at 17 years-old.  He was selected as the only one youth footballer candidate from Thailand to reaching an opportunity to test footsteps with 99 footballers from 40 countries around the world under a worldwide football campaign,  Nike's The Chance.

Club career

Chonburi F.C.

Born in Rayong, Thailand, Apirat began his career in Chonburi youth categories in 2011.  He was subsequently assigned to the youth side for a year and being promoted to the first-team in 2012.

Rayong United

After struggling to make his breakthrough, He moved to Rayong United on loan in 2013.  He love to played with the club as his hometown club.  He returned to parent club successfully in end of season with experience and capped 1 goal.

Trat F.C.

In the following season, struggling to make his breakthrough again.  He moved to Trat on loan in 2014 to gain an experience.

Prachuap F.C.

In the following season, 2015, Apirat began being more utilized after the arrival of star and experienced players.  He decided to left current club and join highly rated club, Prachuap with 2 years deal.  He enjoyed to play with tremendous performance by 47 capped, scoring 13 goals.

In late of season 2016, His contract will ending in December 2016.  The rumor signed he is leaving the club to join Thai League 1 clubs such as Highly rated club, Bangkok Glass and Sisaket.  To re-unite working with his ex-Prachuap F.C. Head coach, Dusit Chalermsan.

On 17 November 2016, Apirat signed a new contract with Prachuap.

References

External links

Apirat Heemkhao
Apirat Heemkhao
1993 births
Apirat Heemkhao
Apirat Heemkhao
Apirat Heemkhao
Living people
Nike Academy players
Association football midfielders
Apirat Heemkhao